The Palestine Red Crescent Society (PRCS) was founded in 1968, by Fathi Arafat, Yasser Arafat's brother. It is a humanitarian organization that is part of the International Red Cross and Red Crescent Movement. It provides hospitals, emergency medicine and ambulance services, and primary health care centers in the West Bank and Gaza Strip. Its headquarters is in Ramallah, near Jerusalem.

Ambulance services
The PRCS provides the majority of ambulance services in the territories, such as providing emergency medical and relief services to Palestinians as mandated in 1996 by then PLO leader Yasser Arafat. Ambulance services are provided by 41 stations and substations, 22 mobile field posts, 122 ambulances, 346 Emergency Medical Technicians (EMTs) and over 500 volunteers.

1996 also saw the foundation of the Emergency Medical Institute, which trains staff and EMTs in accordance with international standards. Furthermore, the PRCS has been instrumental in the establishment of the national emergency number (101).

Special problems

Conflict between Israelis and Palestinians has created some special issues for service delivery.

Israeli authorities have required Palestinian ambulances to undergo a through search when passing through checkpoints, delaying patient care with significant negative outcomes. For example, between the years 2000 and 2007, it was estimated that 16% of pregnant women had to wait at checkpoints for periods exceeding two hours, resulting in 68 women giving birth at checkpoints, 35 instances of miscarriage, and 5 maternal deaths in a seven-year period. According to Israeli sources, this policy is the result of Palestinian organizations using ambulances to transport terrorists and armament during the Second Intifada, making it necessary to inspect Palestinian ambulances regardless of the seriousness of the patient's condition. Israel made similar claims during the 2008–2009 Gaza War; however, Amnesty International denies that Hamas had systematically used medical facilities, vehicles and uniforms as a cover, stating that no evidence had been provided proving such actions. Further, Magen David Adom's submission to the UN Mission investigating the war stated that, "there was no use of PRCS ambulances for the transport of weapons or ammunition ... [and] there was no misuse of the emblem by PRCS."

According to the PRCS, Israeli Defense Force personnel on the ground and in aircraft have deliberately targeted Palestinian ambulances, and prevented or impeded them from carrying out their duties, in violation of international humanitarian law. In 2003, for example, the PRCS reported that seven staff members were injured and 12 ambulances were damaged in attacks by Israeli settlers and the IDF, and PRCS ambulances were denied or delayed access to areas on 584 different occasions.

See also
 Health care in the Palestinian territories
 List of hospitals in the State of Palestine
 Emergency medical services in Israel

References

External links

 PRCS website
 PRCS summary on ReliefWeb

Palestinian charities
Organizations established in 1968
Emergency services in the State of Palestine
Red Cross and Red Crescent national societies
International Falcon Movement – Socialist Educational International
Medical and health organizations based in the State of Palestine
Organizations based in Al-Bireh